John IV (Syriac: Mor Yuhanon) was the Patriarch of Antioch, and head of the Syriac Orthodox Church from 846 until his death in 873.

Biography
John became a monk, and later priest, at the Monastery of St Zacchaeus, near the city of Raqqa in Syria. During this time, he also studied at the monastery. In February 846, following the death of Dionysius I Telmaharoyo, Patriarch of Antioch, John was elected and consecrated Patriarch of Antioch at the Monastery of Shila near Serugh. After his consecration, John issued twenty-five canons. John's twenty-second canon forbade the adoption of pagan funeral customs and his twenty-third canon forbade adherents who had married their daughters to pagans, Jews, and Zoroastrians from entering the church. He corresponded with Pope Joseph I of Alexandria, head of the Coptic Orthodox Church, a fellow miaphysite church, early in his reign.

He later consecrated a certain David, a monk of the Monastery of Qartmin, as Bishop of Harran. In 869, John held the Council of Capharthutha and issued eight canons on the offices of patriarch and maphrian. A total of eighty-six bishops were ordained by John during his tenure and he served in the office of patriarch until his death on 3 January 873.

Notes
John IV is also counted as John III as the third patriarch of the Syriac Orthodox Church by that name, however, the Syriac Orthodox Church, which claims descent from the Church of Antioch, considers John of the Sedre (r. 631–648) to be the third by that name.

References

Bibliography

873 deaths
Syriac Patriarchs of Antioch from 512 to 1783
Year of birth unknown
9th-century Syriac Orthodox Church bishops
9th-century Oriental Orthodox archbishops
Syrian archbishops
Upper Mesopotamia under the Abbasid Caliphate
9th-century people from the Abbasid Caliphate